Poropuntius melanogrammus is a species of ray-finned fish in the genus Poropuntius from the drainage of the Maeklong and nearby regions of western Thailand.

References 

melanogrammus
Taxa named by Tyson R. Roberts
Fish described in 1998